This Time Around: Live in Tokyo is a live album by Deep Purple. After the band's demise in 1976, a live album called Last Concert in Japan was released in 1977. It was compiled from a show the band did in Tokyo on 15 December 1975. It was heavily edited and, coming on the heels of their previous Japanese-recorded album Made in Japan, it failed to deliver, and was never released neither in UK nor in the US. In 2001, the complete show was released as This Time Around: Live in Tokyo '75.

Track listing

Personnel
Deep Purple
Tommy Bolin – guitar, lead vocals on "Wild dogs"
David Coverdale – lead vocals
Glenn Hughes – bass guitar, lead & backing vocals
Ian Paice – drums
Jon Lord – keyboards, backing vocals

See also
 Rises Over Japan

References

2001 live albums
Deep Purple live albums